Jonas Crivella (born 30 April 1988) is a water polo player from Brazil. He was part of the Brazilian team at the  2015 World Aquatics Championships. and 2016 Summer Olympics. He won two medals at the Pan American Games in 2011 and 2015.

References

Brazilian male water polo players
Living people
1988 births
Water polo players at the 2011 Pan American Games
Water polo players at the 2015 Pan American Games
Pan American Games medalists in water polo
Pan American Games silver medalists for Brazil
Pan American Games bronze medalists for Brazil
Olympic water polo players of Brazil
Water polo players at the 2016 Summer Olympics
Medalists at the 2011 Pan American Games
Medalists at the 2015 Pan American Games
Water polo players from Rio de Janeiro (city)
21st-century Brazilian people